Pepeni is a commune in Sîngerei District, Moldova. It is composed of four villages: Pepeni, Pepenii Noi, Răzălăi and Romanovca.

References

Communes of Sîngerei District